TIS (Thailand-Indonesia-Singapore) is a submarine telecommunications cable system in the South China Sea linking Thailand, Singapore, and Indonesia

It has landing points in:
Songkhla, Songkhla Province, Thailand
Changi, Singapore
Batam, Riau Islands, Indonesia

It has an initial transmission capacity of 30 Gbit/s, upgradeable to 320 Gbit/s, and a total cable length of approximately 1,100 km.  It started operation in December 2003.

References

 
 
 

Submarine communications cables in the Pacific Ocean
Indonesia–Thailand relations
Singapore–Thailand relations
Indonesia–Singapore relations
2003 establishments in Indonesia
2003 establishments in Singapore
2003 establishments in Thailand